The latticetail moray (Gymnothorax buroensis) is a moray eel found in coral reefs in the Pacific and Indian Oceans. It was first named by Pieter Bleeker in 1857, and is commonly also known as the vagrant moray, Buru moray eel, or Buro moray.

References

External links
 Fishes of Australia : Gymnothorax buroensis

latticetail moray
Marine fish of Northern Australia
latticetail moray